Navarretia setiloba is a rare species of flowering plant in the phlox family known by the common names Paiute Mountain pincushionplant and Piute Mountains navarretia.

Distribution
The plant is endemic to California, where it is known from fewer than ten occurrences at the southern tip of the Sierra Nevada, Tehachapi Mountains, San Emigdio Mountains, and adjacent southern San Joaquin Valley, primarily within Kern County, California.

It is named for Piute Mountain in the Southern Sierra near Lake Isabella, not the Piute Mountains of the Mojave Desert, which are far outside its range. It is a California Native Plant Society listed critically endangered species.

Description
The leaves are divided into many forked linear lobes.

The inflorescence is a cluster of flowers surrounded by leaflike bracts. The flowers are about a centimeter long and are purple-blue with white throats.  The bloom period is April to July.

References

External links
 Calflora Database: Navarretia setiloba (Paiute Mountain pincushionplant,  Piute Mountains navarretia)
Jepson Manual eFlora (TJM2) treatment of Navarretia setiloba
UC CalPhotos gallery: Navarretia setiloba

setiloba
Endemic flora of California
Flora of the Sierra Nevada (United States)
Natural history of the California chaparral and woodlands
Natural history of Kern County, California
Natural history of the Transverse Ranges
~
Critically endangered flora of California